Saskia Maria Desiree Vogel (born September 17, 1981) is an American author and translator. Permission, her debut novel, was published in English, Spanish, Italian, and Swedish  in 2019 and has been optioned for television. She has translated leading Swedish authors such as Karolina Ramqvist, Katrine Marcal, Johannes Anyuru and Rut Hillarp. Vogel has written on the themes of gender, power and sexuality, and her translations and writing have appeared in publications such as Granta, Guernica, The White Review, The Offing, Paris Review Daily, and The Quietus. She received an honorable mention from the Pushchart Prize in 2017 for her "Sluts", first published by The Offing. Her translation of Lina Wolff's The Polyglot Lovers (published by And Other Stories, 2019) won the English PEN Translates Award. In 2018, her translation of Karolina Ramqvist's The White City was shortlisted for the Petrona Award.

She has lived in Sweden, the UK and the US and currently resides in Berlin, Germany.

Translated works
 The summer of Kim Novak by Håkan Nesser. 2015.
 Who Cooked Adam Smith's Dinner? by Katrine Marçal. 2015.
 All Monsters Must Die: An Excursion to North Korea by Magnus Bärtås and Fredrik Ekman. 2015.
 The Anatomy of Inequality by Per Molander. 2016.
 The White City by Karolina Ramqvist. 2017.
 Acts of Infidelity by Lena Andersson. 2018.
 They Will Drown in Their Mothers' Tears by Johannes Anyuru. 2019.
 The Polyglot Lovers by Lina Wolff. 2019.
 And In the Vienna Woods The Trees Remain by Elisabeth Åsbrink. 2020.
 Many People Die Like You by Lina Wolff. 2020.
 (co-translated with Paul Norlen) Our House Is on Fire by Greta Thunberg, Malena Ernman et al. 2020.
 Girls Lost by Jessica Schiefauer. 2020.
 October Child by Linda Boström Knausgård. 2021.
 The Bear Woman by Karolina Ramqvist. 2022.

References

External links

Living people
1981 births
Writers from Los Angeles
American expatriates in Germany
American expatriates in Sweden
American expatriates in England
Novelists from California
American women novelists
21st-century American translators
21st-century American novelists
21st-century American women writers
Swedish–English translators